SS Arab was a steamship built by James & George Thomson and launched in 1879 for the Union Steamship Company. She was transferred to the Union-Castle Mail Steamship Company in 1901 and scrapped that year at Harburg.

Arab brought home the New South Wales Contingent that had served in Sudan with British forces as part of the Suakin Expedition, arriving at Sydney on 19 June 1885.

External links
The Ship List - Union Steamship Company
Clyde built ships - Arab

1879 ships
Ships built on the River Clyde
Steamships of the United Kingdom